The 2022 Play In Challenger was a professional tennis tournament played on indoor hard courts. It was the fourth edition of the tournament, which was part of the 2022 ATP Challenger Tour. It took place in Lille, France, between 21 and 27 March 2022.

Singles main-draw entrants

Seeds

 1 Rankings are as of 14 March 2022.

Other entrants
The following players received wildcards into the singles main draw:
  Simon Beaupain
  Sean Cuenin
  Sascha Gueymard Wayenburg

The following players received entry into the singles main draw using protected rankings:
  Malek Jaziri
  Yannick Maden

The following players received entry from the qualifying draw:
  Viktor Durasovic
  Arthur Fils
  Jonáš Forejtek
  Alexis Galarneau
  Laurent Lokoli
  Henri Squire

Champions

Singles

  Quentin Halys def.  Ričardas Berankis 4–6, 7–6(7–4), 6–4.

Doubles

  Viktor Durasovic /  Patrik Niklas-Salminen def.  Jonathan Eysseric /  Quentin Halys 7–5, 7–6(7–1).

References

2022 ATP Challenger Tour
2022 in French tennis
March 2022 sports events in France